Aa Ammayi Gurinchi Meeku Cheppali is a 2022 Indian Telugu-language romantic drama film written and directed by Mohana Krishna Indraganti and produced by Benchmark Studios and Mythri Movie Makers. The film stars Sudheer Babu and Krithi Shetty. It was released on 16 September 2022 to mixed reviews and was a box office bomb.

Plot 
Naveen is a very commercial film director in Telugu cinema who has just scored his 6th back-to-back hit and is looking to make another film. After coming back from his producer Parameshwar's house a garbage truck dumps a bunch of trash onto his car. Naveen then finds an old container that has a film reel and decides to check. In the reel, Naveen finds scenes of a girl enacting and is mesmerized by it. He decides to find out who she is and learns that she is an eye doctor named Alekhya. Naveen decides to talk with Alekhya to get her to be a part of his film, but she starts to grow hatred towards him, as her family has a deep hatred for cinema people. One day, at an event for Alekhya's hospital, Naveen is invited as the chief guest and gives Alekhya a present. After the event, one of the couples present at the event tell Naveen how much his films have positively impacted their deceased son. 

Alekhya is moved by the story and decides to open Naveen's gift. After reading what was inside the gift, Alekhya decides to visit Naveen at his house. Naveen then shows Alekhya the reel he found and she reveals that the person in the reel is not her, but is her twin sister Akhila, who looks just like her. Alekhya tells Naveen that 6 years ago, Akhila was always into acting ever since she was a child, but her parents never liked the idea as it would hurt their reputation in society, especially after Akhila does an intimate scene in a performance of Romeo and Juliet. Akhila started to act in a film directed by her friend Deepak. However during filming, Akhila's father pulled her out of the film and an enraged Akhila decided to leave the house. Akhila and Deepak later got married without her parents knowing and they disown her. Later, Deepak's producer and their family die in a car accident causing the film to be stalled completely, which makes Deepak to fall into depression. 

Due to the depression, Deepak committed suicide leaving Akhila distraught at what happened. Not being able to take this, Akhila also decided to commit suicide by jumping off of the apartment building. The family completely shuns cinema from there onwards. Touched after listening to Akhila's past, Naveen decides to write a story based on Akhila and Deepak's life and he pitches this idea to Venkat, who approves. Naveen visits Alekhya and tells her on how he wants Alekhya to play Akhila's character in his film. Alekhya is reluctant, but Naveen tells her his story about how as a debutant in the industry, his first love was asked to sleep with a producer in order to land a role and agreed to do it, and how he was about to also commit suicide, but after seeing Deepak's death in the newspaper, Naveen gets himself motivated to take commercial films and to make money. He explains his genuine intention to actually make a good movie that gives a proper tribute to Akhila and Deepak. Alekhya eventually agrees to star in the film without her parents or her relatives knowing. 

Alekhya and Naveen slowly fall in love with each other. Alekhya's parents introduce Alekhya to Varun, the scientist son of a family friend, and someone they desire to be Alekhya's future husband. Varun actually ends up meeting Alekhya once more with Naveen as he was doing a minor role in Naveen's movie, though he eventually understands and is friendly about it. Everything goes smoothly until one of her relatives spots her. This enrages Alekhya's parents and Alekhya gets mad that they suppressed her sister and her emotions which led her to her death. She then decides to leave the house as her father believes a gossip circulated about her and Naveen. Alekhya decides to complete the film. After the film is completed, Naveen approaches Alekhya's parents and tells them that he really made a sincere attempt at honoring Akhila and Deepak, and thinks they will be touched as well. He promises that if their perspectives aren't changed, he will leave Alekhya alone forever and never show his face to them. Thus, they show up to the premiere. Initially unfriendly, the movie begins to make them realize the mistakes they made. Naveen surprises them and tells them that he has included the shots from Akhila's reel in the film for some of the scenes and they emotionally break down. They tell Naveen and Alekhya that they are proud of both of them for the film and for giving a proper tribute to both Deepak and Akhila's lives. Naveen and Alekhya make their relationship official.

Cast 
 Sudheer Babu as Naveen
 Krithi Shetty as Dr. Alekhya and Akhila
 Srinivas Avasarala as Dr. Varun
 Vennela Kishore as Bose
 Rahul Ramakrishna as Venkat
 Viswant Duddumpudi as Deepak
 Srikanth Iyengar as Manohar, Alekhya and Akhila's father
 Kalyani Natarajan as Sumithra, Alekhya and Akhila's mother
 Thalaivasal Vijay as Dr. James Kutty, Alekhya’s boss
 Kunal Kaushik
 Satish Saripalli
 Vamsi Raghava Yenumula

Production 
In November 2020, it was announced that Sudheer Babu and Mohana Krishna Indraganti were coming together for the third time under the tentative title #Sudheer14 after Sammohanam (2018) and V (2020). In March 2021 the film's title was announced as Aa Ammayi Gurinchi Meeku Cheppali.

It was announced in January 2021 that Krithi Shetty was brought on board for the lead female role in the film. 

The principal photography of the film began on 1 March 2021.

Soundtrack 
The film score and soundtrack of the film is composed by Vivek Sagar. The music rights were acquired by Saregama.

Reception 
Sangeetha Devi of The Hindu wrote about the film as "Earnest and fairly engaging ode to cinema". Neeshita Nyayapati of The Times of India rated the film 3 out of 5 stars and wrote "AAGMC is not a perfect film by any means because there are scenes you wish would've been written better and conversations that delve deeper". Pinkvilla rated the film 2.5 out of 5 stars and wrote "Themes such as overcoming pangs of guilt, self-redemption, living someone's dream, and finding peace in defying conventions, are drowned out by many below-ordinary scenes. The Hans India rated the film 2 out of 5 stars and wrote "The patchy writing doesn't elevate the proceedings. An inconsistency is felt, and that's where Aa Ammayi Gurinchi Meeku Cheppali falters." Sakshi Post rated the film 2 out of 5 stars and opined that the film offers nothing new.

References

External links 
 

2022 films
2022 romantic drama films
Films about actors
Indian romantic drama films
Indian nonlinear narrative films
Films about the film industry
Works about films
Films about film directors and producers
Films about journalists
Films about filmmaking
Films about entertainers
Films about mass media people
Films about mass media owners
Mythri Movie Makers films
Films directed by Mohan Krishna Indraganti